Nova Sports is a Greek sports pay television network owned by Nova, a subsidiary of Greek telecommunications company of the same name. It was launched in 1994 as SuperSport and at the time was the first premium sports service in Greece. It is available exclusively on Nova, a DTH satellite service. It is available terrestrially and via satellite only on Nova.

Nova Sports covers most major national and international sports, such as first division soccer, the top leagues in Europe and around the world (EuroLeague basketball) and exclusive coverage of the English League Cup. Nova Sports also broadcasts other sports such as volleyball and table tennis. Nova Sports also features extensive Tennis coverage.

Nova Sports 1 broadcasts on terrestrial television timeshifting with Nova Cinema 1 at night and earlier with Disney XD (children's channel) during the day. A decoder is required in order to receive the services as well as a monthly fee. Repeaters have been set up across the country that enables more than 77% of the population to receive these services. The multiplex channels (Nova Sports 2–7) are available only through Nova.

SuperSport era
From 1994 until 1 June 2008, Nova Sports was known as SuperSport.

The SuperSport brand is still prevalent in South Africa as the name is used thereby DStv which is a satellite television provider owned by MultiChoice South Africa, the previous owners of Greece's SuperSport as well.

Some events shown on Nova Sports are still taken directly from SuperSport (South Africa) broadcast feeds, complete with SuperSport logos and on-screen promotions. These normally include Golf and Rugby Union matches, and occasionally result in the second audio feed, which usually broadcasts English alongside Greek, broadcasting commentary in Afrikaans.

Channels and content

Novasports operates fourteen (14) multiplex channels, all of which are of 1080p (HD) quality:

Novasports News
Novasports Start
Novasports Prime
Novasports 1
Novasports 2
Novasports 3
Novasports 4
Novasports 5
Novasports 6
Novasports Premier League
Novasports Extra 1
Novasports Extra 2
Novasports Extra 3
Novasports Extra 4

Original programs
Time of the Champions - Football show covering Super League Greece with news, interviews, statistical analysis and highlights (pre- and postgame).
Playmakers - Basketball show covering EuroLeague Basketball with news, interviews, statistical analysis and highlights (pre- and postgame).
Monday Football Club (Monday FC) - Football show covering the reviews and highlights of past weekend matches (Super League, Premier League, LaLiga, Bundesliga, Ligue 1 and Eredivisie). The program is being aired on Monday nights. When it is shown in different weekdays, it is called ,,Novasports Football Club,, (Novasports FC).
Novasports Challenge - Mini interviews with former legends (players and coaches) of the Greek football championship.
Novasports Moments - Flashback moments from retro games of the Greek football championship that were left unattended in time.
Kings of Europe - Mini tributes to important moments of the European national football championship.
Novasports Exclusive - A documentary series with extended interviews of high profile players and coaches of Greek sport.

Sports

Football

Club competitions
Super League (Home matches of Aris, PAOK, Atromitos, PAS Giannina, Asteras Tripolis, Levadiakos)
Premier League
La Liga
Segunda División
Bundesliga
2. Bundesliga
DFL-Supercup
Serie B
Coppa Italia
Supercoppa Italiana
Ligue 1
Trophée des Champions
Eredivisie
Belgian First Division A
Belgian Cup
Belgian Super Cup

National team competitions
2026 FIFA World Cup qualification
UEFA Euro 2024 qualifying
UEFA Nations League
Arabian Gulf Cup

Basketball

Club competitions
EuroLeague
EuroCup
National Collegiate Athletic Association
NCAA Division I men's basketball tournament
NCAA Division I women's basketball tournament

National team competitions
FIBA Basketball World Cup
FIBA Women's Basketball World Cup
2023 FIBA Basketball World Cup qualification
FIBA World Olympic Qualifying Tournaments
EuroBasket
EuroBasket Women
EuroBasket 2025 qualification

Volleyball

Club competitions
FIVB Volleyball Men's Club World Championship
FIVB Volleyball Women's Club World Championship

National team competitions
FIVB Volleyball Men's World Championship
FIVB Volleyball Women's World Championship
FIVB Volleyball Men's Nations League
FIVB Volleyball Women's Nations League

Tennis
Australian Open (via Eurosport)
French Open (via Eurosport)
US Open (via Eurosport)
Wimbledon Championships
WTA 250 tournaments
WTA 500 tournaments
WTA 1000 tournaments
WTA Finals
Davis Cup

Golf
Masters Tournament
PGA Championship
The Open Championship
US Open
PGA Tour (via Eurosport)

Motorsport
DTM
24 Hours of Le Mans (via Eurosport)
Dakar Rally (via Eurosport)
Superbike World Championship (via Eurosport)
Motocross World Championship (via Eurosport)

Logos

References

External links
Official Site 

Sports television networks
Sports television in Greece
Television channels in Greece
Greek-language television stations
Television channels and stations established in 1994